Goodnight is an unincorporated community in Logan and Payne counties, in the U.S. state of Oklahoma.

History
Goodnight had its start in 1900 when the railroad was extended to that point. A post office was established at Goodnight in 1900, and remained in operation until 1949. The community has the name of Jake Goodnight, a pioneer citizen.

References

Unincorporated communities in Logan County, Oklahoma
Unincorporated communities in Payne County, Oklahoma
Unincorporated communities in Oklahoma